Shenandoah Historic District is a national historic district located at Shenandoah, Page County, Virginia. The district includes 451 contributing buildings, 3 contributing sites, and 4 contributing structures in the town of Shenandoah.  They include residential, commercial, and institutional buildings in a variety of popular late-19th century and early-20th century architectural styles.  Notable buildings include the Eagle Hotel and annex, Western Railway YMCA, Shenandoah General Store (c. 1920), Fields United Methodist Church, Christ United Methodist Church, St. Peter's Lutheran Church, Norfolk and Western Railway Station (c. 1915), and Shenandoah High School. Located in the district is the separately listed Shenandoah Land and Improvement Company Office.

It was listed on the National Register of Historic Places in 2004.

References

Historic districts on the National Register of Historic Places in Virginia
Buildings and structures in Page County, Virginia
National Register of Historic Places in Page County, Virginia